A  is a subdivision (of various types) of Italian city, now unofficial. Depending on the case, a  will be a località, a rione, a quartiere (terziere, etc.), a borgo, or even a suburb. The best-known  are the 17 contrade of Siena, since they form the teams in the palio di Siena.

In other regions, as in most of Lombardy, it may simply be a street, but with historical and social importance; however in Mantua  indicates a street in the old town.

In Veneto, particularly near the Alpine foothills,  is a smaller hamlet in a rural area (a group of houses usually smaller than a frazione). In Vicenza, a  used to be a neighbourhood in the town centre, but now it replaces the noun via (street) in the old town.

The term is not used officially, however.

In the Republic of San Marino,  indicates a street within an inhabited area (e.g. contrada del Collegio and contrada Omerelli in the city of San Marino).

See also
 Circoscrizione
 Frazione
 Località
 Rione
Rioni of Rome
 Quartiere
 Sestiere
 Terziere

References 

Subdivisions of Italy

hu:Contrada